Kuttippuram State assembly constituency was one of the 140 state legislative assembly constituencies in Kerala state in southern India, before the 2008 delimitation of constituencies. It was one of the 7 state legislative assembly constituencies included in the Ponnani Lok Sabha constituency until the 2008 delimitation. The last election to the constituency was conducted in  2006, and the MLA was K. T. Jaleel of LDF.

After the delimitation in 2008, Kuttippuram, Valanchery, and Marakkara Gram Panchayats became a part of the newly formed Kottakkal (State Assembly constituency), whereas Cheriyamundam was added to the Tanur (State Assembly constituency). The remaining four Gram Panchayats became part of Tirur (State Assembly constituency).

Local self governed segments
Kuttippuram Niyamasabha constituency was composed of the following local self governed segments:

Election history

Election results
Percentage change (±%) denotes the change in the number of votes from the immediate previous election.

Niyamasabha Election 2006
There were 1,58,951 registered voters in Kuttippuram Constituency for the 2006 Kerala Niyamasabha Election.

Niyama Sabha Election 2001
There were 1,32,209 registered voters in Kuttippuram Constituency for the 2001 Kerala Niyamasabha Election.

See also
 Kuttippuram
 Kuttippuram Block Panchayat
 Malappuram district
 List of constituencies of the Kerala Legislative Assembly
 2006 Kerala Legislative Assembly election

References

External Links
 

Former assembly constituencies of Kerala